Acrocercops maranthaceae is a moth of the family Gracillariidae. It's known to come from Cuba.

The larvae feed on Maranta species. They mine the leaves of their host plant.

References

maranthaceae
Moths of the Caribbean
Moths described in 1934
Endemic fauna of Cuba